Thomas William Brown (born December 24, 1963) is a former professional American football player for the National Football League's Cincinnati Bengals. He played in two games in the 1987 season after his collegiate career at Augustana College in South Dakota.

References

1963 births
Living people
American football wide receivers
Augustana (South Dakota) Vikings football players
Cincinnati Bengals players
Gustavus Adolphus Golden Gusties athletic directors
Gustavus Adolphus Golden Gusties football coaches
Iowa Hawkeyes football coaches
People from Princeton, Minnesota
Players of American football from Minnesota
University of Iowa alumni 
Educators from Minnesota